Samanabad can refer to:

 Samanabad is a suburb of Lahore, Punjab, Pakistan
 Samanabad Town is an administrative town (tehsil) of Lahore, Punjab, Pakistan
 Samanabad (Karachi) is a suburb of Gulberg Town in Karachi, Sindh, Pakistan
 Samanabad, Iran, a village in South Khorasan Province, Iran